The Bombardment of Chefchaouen was an aerial bombardment of Chefchaouen, Morocco carried out in the middle of the Rif War by a rogue American squadron in the service of the French colonial empire, the Escadrille Cherifienne, on September 17, 1925.

Motivation 
The motivation to bomb Chefchaouen specifically was to drive the Jebala people out of the war, as it was a city the tribe considered holy.

Reflections 
Paul Ayres Rockwell later wrote: "The city looked lovely from the air, hugging its high mountain and surrounded with many gardens and green cultivations… I looked down upon the numerous sanctuaries, the six mosques, the medieval dungeon, the big square with its fountain playing and fervently hoped none of them had been damaged."

References 

Rif War
Berber history
Airstrikes conducted by France